The Max Planck Institute for Mathematics (MPIM) is a prestigious research institute located in Bonn, Germany. It is named in honor of the German physicist Max Planck
and forms part of the Max Planck Society (Max-Planck-Gesellschaft), an association of 84 institutes engaging  in fundamental research in the arts and the sciences. The MPIM is the only Max Planck institute specializing in pure mathematics.

The Institute was founded by Friedrich Hirzebruch in 1980, having emerged from the collaborative research center "Theoretical Mathematics" (Sonderforschungsbereich "Theoretische Mathematik"). Hirzebruch shaped the institute as its director until his retirement in 1995. Currently, the institute is managed by a board of five directors consisting of Peter Teichner (managing director), Werner Ballmann, Gerd Faltings, Peter Scholze,  and Don Zagier. Friedrich Hirzebruch and Yuri Manin were, and Günter Harder is, acting as emeriti.

Research
The Max Planck Institute for Mathematics offers mathematicians from around the world the opportunity to visit Bonn and engage in sabbatical work lasting from weeks to several months. 
This guest program distinguishes the MPIM from other Max Planck institutes, and results in only a limit number of permanent positions  and the absence of separate departments within the institute. 

The research of the members and guests of the institute can be classified into the following areas:

 Algebraic Geometry and Complex Geometry
 Algebraic Groups
 Algebraic Topology
 Arithmetic Geometry
 Differential Geometry and Topology
 Dynamical Systems
 Global Analysis
 Mathematical Physics
 Noncommutative Geometry
 Number Theory
 Representation Theory

References

External links
Homepage 
Homepage 

Research institutes established in 1980
Mathematical institutes
Mathematics
Max-Planck-Institut fur Mathematik
Max-Planck-Institut fur Mathematik
Mathematics in Germany